Heinrich Lauenstein (26 September 1835, Hüddessum, near Hildesheim - 16 May 1910, Düsseldorf) was a German painter and art professor; associated with the Düsseldorfer Malerschule. He specialized in portraits, many of them of children, and religious scenes.

Life and work 
His father, Christoph Lauenstein, was a mill owner in Hildesheim. He worked as a decorative painter until 1859 when, thanks to a grant from King George V of Hanover., he was able to enroll at the Kunstakademie Düsseldorf. There, he studied with Heinrich Mücke, the brothers Andreas and Karl Müller, Karl Ferdinand Sohn and Rudolf Wiegmann. In 1863, he attended history painting classes taught by Eduard Bendemann then, from 1867, studied with the religious painter, Ernst Deger. That same year, he assisted Andreas Müller with murals in the new museum at Sigmaringen Castle.

While still studying, he became an assistant teacher in the beginner's class, which he headed after 1881. His best known students there included Heinrich Nauen and Max Clarenbach. From 1897 until his death, he was  a Professor of religious history painting at the Kunstakademie. His work in that genre was heavily influenced by the Nazarenes, whose style had become largely obsolete by the end of the 1860s.

In 1873, he became a member of the progressive artists' association, Malkasten. The following year, he married Emilie Peters. They had several children. She died in 1893. Their first-born daughter, Ottilie, married the insurance manager, . They had three children, including Heinrich Nordhoff, who became the CEO of Volkswagen AG.

In addition to his regular paintings, he created several altarpieces. Some of his most familiar works were commissioned by the German-American businessman and art collector, John D. Lankenau, of Philadelphia.

Other notable students 

 Georg Burmester (1864–1936)
 Heinrich Hermanns (1862–1942)
 Meinrad Iten (1867–1932)
  (1866–1951)
 Fritz Reiss (1857–1915)
  (1858–1928)
 Wilhelm Schreuer (1866–1933)
 Friedrich Schwinge (1852–1913)
  (1862–1926)
 Fritz von Wille (1860–1941)

References

Further reading 
 "Professor Heinrich Lauenstein" (obituary), In: Rhein und Düssel. Nr. 22, 1910, pp.175-176 (Online)
 "Lauenstein, Heinrich", In: Hans Vollmer (Ed.): Allgemeines Lexikon der Bildenden Künstler von der Antike bis zur Gegenwart, Vol.22: Krügner–Leitch. E. A. Seemann, Leipzig 1928, pg.434
 "Lauenstein, Heinrich", In: Friedrich von Boetticher: Malerwerke des neunzehnten Jahrhunderts. Beitrag zur Kunstgeschichte. Vol.I, Dresden 1895, pg.814 (Online)

External links 

1835 births
1910 deaths
German painters
German portrait painters
Religious painters
Kunstakademie Düsseldorf alumni
Academic staff of Kunstakademie Düsseldorf
People from Hildesheim (district)